Allyl chloride is the organic compound with the formula CH2=CHCH2Cl. This colorless liquid is insoluble in water but soluble in common organic solvents.  It is mainly converted to epichlorohydrin, used in the production of plastics. It is a chlorinated derivative of propylene.  It is an alkylating agent, which makes it both useful and hazardous to handle.

Production

Laboratory scale
Allyl chloride was first produced in 1857 by Auguste Cahours and August Hofmann by reacting allyl alcohol with phosphorus trichloride. Modern preparation protocols economize this approach, replacing relatively expensive phosphorus trichloride with hydrochloric acid and a catalyst such as copper(I) chloride.

Industrial scale
Allyl chloride is produced by the chlorination of propylene.  At lower temperatures, the main product is 1,2-dichloropropane, but at 500 °C, allyl chloride predominates, being formed via a free radical reaction:
CH3CH=CH2  +  Cl2   →  ClCH2CH=CH2  +  HCl
An estimated 800,000 tonnes were produced this way in 1997.

Reactions and uses
The great majority of allyl chloride is converted to epichlorohydrin.  Other commercially significant derivatives include allyl alcohol, allylamine, allyl isothiocyanate (synthetic mustard oil), and 1-bromo-3-chloropropane.

As an alkylating agent, it is useful in the manufacture of pharmaceuticals and pesticides, such as mustard oil.

Illustrative reactions
Illustrative of its reactivity is its cyanation to allyl cyanide (CH2=CHCH2CN). Being a reactive alkyl halide, it undergoes reductive coupling to give diallyl:
2 ClCH2CH=CH2  +  Mg  →   (CH2)2(CH=CH2)2  +  MgCl2

It undergoes oxidative addition to palladium(0) to give allylpalladium chloride dimer, (C3H5)2Pd2Cl2.  Dehydrohalogenation gives cyclopropene.

Safety
Allyl chloride is highly toxic and flammable. Eye effects may be delayed and may lead to possible impairment of vision.

See also 
 Allyl
 Allyl bromide
 Allyl iodide

External links 

IARC Monograph *Allyl chloride.

References

Chloroalkenes
IARC Group 3 carcinogens
Allyl compounds